The Daeyeonggak Hotel fire was a skyscraper fire in Seoul, South Korea on 25 December 1971; 164 people died and 63 were injured . It remains the deadliest hotel fire in history.

Background
The 22-storey Daeyeonggak Hotel (also called Hotel Taeyongak) was a luxury hotel completed in 1969. It had 222 rooms. A total of one hundred and eighty-seven guests and about one hundred and thirty workers were presumed to have been in the hotel prior to the fire. Of the registered guests, forty-seven were listed as foreigners. 

The design of the building was said to have played a part in the high death toll. The two internal stairwells were designed for use in case of lift failures and not as fire exits, and lacked fireproof doors. Consequently the stairwells filled with smoke during the fire, acting as chimneys, and spread the fire to upper floors of the building. The building had no external emergency staircase. The walls between the hotel rooms were not sufficiently fire resistant, hastening the spread of the blaze. The tower lacked many other safety features, including battery-operated exit lights.

Fire
The fire was reportedly due to an explosion of propane gas that had been used as cooking fuel in a coffee shop, located on the second floor. The fire burned for ten hours. Many were unable to find the exit in the darkness. The fire department's ladders only reached the eighth floor, trapping those from the ninth to the 22nd storeys. Only eight people were reported as being rescued from windows. 

Twelve helicopters, including those from the United States military bases, were mobilised to try to rescue guests from the roof using aerial slings.

Victims 
At least thirty-eight people died leaping from windows to escape the inferno, some clinging to mattresses in an attempt to survive the fall. At least one man fell to his death from a helicopter. Sixty-nine people were reported as injured with many of them listed in serious condition.

The 162nd death was that of Yu Sien-yung, the minister of the Taiwanese embassy in Seoul, who lived alone in the hotel. He was trapped in the burning building for more than 10 hours and died in hospital, aged 64, on 4 January 1972.

Legal 
The authorities arrested eight people in connection with the disaster. These included Kim Yong-san and four other hotel officials, who were charged with carelessness and improper construction, as well as two former city officials and a fire officer on charges of negligence.

Aftermath 
Two senior fire services officers of the Hong Kong Government flew to Seoul on 11 January 1972 to confer with the South Koreans on fire prevention. President Park Chung-hee mentioned the fire in a New Years press conference on 11 January 1972 where he claimed that careless fire management of the building and of the building material were to blame.

The building was remodeled after the fire. There was another fire there on 27 February 2010.

See also
 2010 Shanghai fire

References

1971 in South Korea
Building and structure fires in South Korea
1971 fires in Asia
Hotel fires
1970s in Seoul
December 1971 events in Asia
Disasters in Seoul
High-rise fires